= Constituency PSW-141 =

Reserved constituency of the Provincial Assembly of Sindh, Pakistan

PSW-141
- Provincial Reserved constituency for the Provincial Assembly of Sindh

Current constituency

PSW-141 is a Constituency reserved for a female in the Provincial Assembly of Sindh.

== See also ==
- Sindh
